The Suncoast Emmy Awards are regional Emmy awards presented by the Suncoast Chapter of the National Academy of Television Arts and Sciences (NATAS) that represents Florida; Alexandria, Baton Rouge, Lafayette, Lake Charles, & New Orleans, Louisiana; Mobile, Alabama; Thomasville, Georgia; and Puerto Rico. NATAS presents the Emmy among sectors of the television industry in several award ceremonies.

Regional Emmy awards

Historical Emmy award winners

Other awards
In addition to the annual Emmy Awards, the chapter awards professionals in several other categories.

Silver Circle awards
The Silver Circle Award recognizes those people who have made significant contributions to television over a period of 25 years or more. The Suncoast Chapter has offered these awards to television professionals in South Florida since 1989. The Puerto Rican members with the support of the Chapter, under the direction of Victor Montilla have produced three formal dinners in San Juan giving Silver Circle awards to Paquito Cordero, Jacobo Morales, Tommy Muñiz and José Miguel Agrelot.

Golden Circle awards
The Golden Circle Award is given to those television professionals who have distinguished themselves by their work in television over a period of fifty years or more.

Governor's award
The Governor's Award is the most prestigious award given by the Academy.  Since the first award in 1978 to Mitchell Wolfson, who founded television in South Florida, the award has been presented over 18 times.  

The Governor's Award recognizes those persons, or those television entities, who are worthy of recognition for the quality of their contribution to television in the Suncoast region, but are not otherwise eligible for an Emmy Award for their work.

Other programs

The Chapter also offers seminars and awards scholarships to distinguished scholars in the field.

References

Regional Emmy Awards